TFF 2. Lig (Turkish Football Federation Second League), is the third level in the Turkish football league system. It was founded in the 2001–02 season with the name of Turkish Second League Category B as a continuation of the then second level division. In the 2005–06 season the name of the league was changed to Lig B. Since the 2007–08 season the league's current name is used along with sponsor names.

Turkish Second Football League (in Turkish: Türkiye İkinci Futbol Ligi or shortly İkinci Lig or 2. Lig) is a defunct football league in Turkey. It was the second level division in Turkish football since its foundation in 1963–64 until the formation of the new league system in 2001–02. The Second Football League was divided into two categories in the 2001–02 season: Category A and Category B. Since 2007–08 Category A has continued as the TFF First League and Category B has continued as the TFF Second League.

League status
In the 2009–10 season the league contained 55 clubs spread out over 4 groups of 11 or 12 teams. The league is played over two rounds. In the first round, ten teams in five groups play with other teams in their group, like a regular season. Top two teams of each group qualify to the "play-off group". They form a play-off league (consisting of ten teams) and play a regular season starting with zero points. The remaining eight teams in each group keep their points and they play again with each other. These new eight-teamed groups are called "classifying groups". The top two teams in each play-off group are promoted to the TFF First League. The three teams classified as third to fifth in each play-off group join the extra play-offs with top teams from each of the five classifying groups. These eight teams play a knockout competition (in a neutral venue) to determine the last team to be promoted. The bottom three teams of the classifying groups are relegated to the TFF Third League. The top four clubs from the Promotion Group of the TFF Third League are then promoted to the TFF Second League, while eight others play in a play-off.

In the 2010–11 season the league was played with 36 teams in two groups, white and red. The winners of each group are directly promoted to the 1. Lig (TFF First League). In each group 2nd through 5th teams compete in the play-off with the respective team in the other group to determine the finalists. The finalists play a single game to determine the third team to be promoted. The bottom three teams in each group are relegated to the 3. Lig (TFF Third League).

League history
1963–64 Turkish Second Football League
League was founded in 1963–64 as a single group with 13 teams.

Promotion and relegation:

1964–65 Turkish Second Football League

Promotion and relegation:

1965–66 Turkish Second Football League

Promotion and relegation:

1966–67 Turkish Second Football League

Promotion and relegation:

1967–68 Turkish Second Football League

Promotion and relegation:

1968–69 Turkish Second Football League

Promotion and relegation:

1969–70 Turkish Second Football League

Promotion and relegation:

1970–71 Turkish Second Football League

Promotion and relegation:

1971–72 Turkish Second Football League

Promotion and relegation:

1972–73 Turkish Second Football League

Promotion and relegation:

1973–74 Turkish Second Football League

Promotion and relegation:

1974–75 Turkish Second Football League

Promotion and relegation:

1975–76 Turkish Second Football League

Promotion and relegation:

1976–77 Turkish Second Football League

Promotion and relegation:

1977–78 Turkish Second Football League

Promotion and relegation:

1978–79 Turkish Second Football League

Promotion and relegation:

1979–80 Turkish Second Football League

Promotion and relegation:

1980–81 Turkish Second Football League

Promotion and relegation:

1981–82 Turkish Second Football League

Promotion and relegation:

1982–83 Turkish Second Football League

Promotion and relegation:

1983–84 Turkish Second Football League

Promotion and relegation:

1984–85 Turkish Second Football League

Promotion and relegation:

1985–86 Turkish Second Football League

Promotion and relegation:

1986–87 Turkish Second Football League

Promotion and relegation:

1987–88 Turkish Second Football League

Promotion and relegation:

1988–89 Turkish Second Football League

Promotion and relegation:

1989–90 Turkish Second Football League

Promotion and relegation:

1990–91 Turkish Second Football League

Promotion and relegation:

1991–92 Turkish Second Football League

Promotion and relegation:

1992–93 Turkish Second Football League

Promotion and relegation:

1993–94 Turkish Second Football League

Promotion and relegation:

1994–95 Turkish Second Football League

Promotion and relegation:

1995–96 Turkish Second Football League

Promotion and relegation:

1996–97 Turkish Second Football League

Promotion and relegation:

1997–98 Turkish Second Football League

Promotion and relegation:

1998–99 Turkish Second Football League

Promotion and relegation:

1999–2000 Turkish Second Football League

Promotion and relegation:

2000–01 Turkish Second Football League

Promotion and relegation:

Source: Cem Pekin Archives and TFF and mackolik.com.

Past promotion since 2001–02
Regional Group System

Promotion–Classification Group System

Dual Group System

Past relegation since 2001–02
Regional Group System

Promotion–Classification Group System

Dual Group System

See also
Süper Lig
TFF First League
TFF Third League
Turkish Regional Amateur League
Turkish Amateur Football Leagues
Turkish Cup

References

 
Sports leagues established in 2001
2001 establishments in Turkey
3
Turk
Professional sports leagues in Turkey